Novogeorgiyevka is a rural locality (a settlement) in Pervoertilskoye Rural Settlement, Ertilsky District, Voronezh Oblast, Russia. The population was 113 as of 2010. There are 2 streets.

Geography 
Novogeorgiyevka is located 15 km south of Ertil (the district's administrative centre) by road. Znamenka is the nearest rural locality.

References 

Rural localities in Ertilsky District